Sir Robert Hales ( – 14 June 1381) was Grand Prior of the Knights Hospitaller of England, Lord High Treasurer, and Admiral of the West. He was killed in the Peasants' Revolt.

Career
In 1372 Robert Hales became the Lord/Grand Prior of the Knights Hospitallers of England. Richard II appointed him Lord High Treasurer, so he was responsible for collecting the hated poll tax. He was appointed Admiral of the West from 24 November 1376 – 24 November 1377. He was beheaded on 14 June 1381 on Tower Hill during the Peasants Revolt. His estate and assets were inherited by his brother, Sir Nicholas de Hales, the progenitor of many prominent English Hales families. Robert Hales was present at many latter-day crusader expeditions, and is recorded as leading a contingent of hospitaller knights at the sacking of Alexandria.

Hales was described by the chronicler Thomas Walsingham as a "Magnanimous knight, though the Commons loved him not".

Personal
He was the son of Nicholas Hales and his brother was Sir Nicholas de Hales, who inherited his father's estates in Kent.

|-

References

1325 births
1381 deaths
English admirals
Priors of Saint John of Jerusalem in England
People from High Halden
Lord High Treasurers of England
Year of birth unknown
Christians of the Alexandrine Crusade